A Long Journey is a 2011 documentary film directed by Lúcia Murat. It won the best film award at the 39th Gramado Film Festival.

Synopsis 
In 1969, during the dictatorship in Brazil, a family sends their youngest son out of the country in order to avoid their engagement in the armed struggle, as their sister did. Hector travels the world for nine years and, during this time, sends letters to his relatives.

Cast 
Caio Blat .... Heitor

References

External links 
 

2011 films
2010s Portuguese-language films
Brazilian drama films
Brazilian independent films
Films directed by Lúcia Murat
2011 drama films
2011 independent films